Pagoto is a surname. Notable people with the surname include:

Andrea Pagoto (born 1985), Italian cyclist
Sherry Pagoto, American behavioral scientist and clinical psychologist